Clémence Calvin (born 17 May 1990) is a French runner. She has won silver medal at the 2014 European Championships in Zürich in the 10,000 metres event, behind the winner Jo Pavey.

Biography 

She won the team silver medal at the 2013 European Cross Country Championships, at Belgrade, alongside Sophie Duarte, Christine Bardelle and Laila Traby, after having taken  12th place as an individual.

Winner of French National Cross Country Championships at the start of the 2014 season, she won in June 2014 the European Cup 10,000m at Skopje, in Macedonia, in the time of 31:52.86.

In December 2019, Calvin along with her coach and husband (Samir Dahmani) received a 4 year ban from competition for evading a drug test in March 2019. The ban is due to be in force until 17 December 2023.

Prize List

International

National 
French National Championships :
winner of 1500m en 2014
winner of 5000m en 2015
French Cross Country Championships :
winner of long course in 2013 and 2016
winner of short course in 2014

References

External links

People from Vichy
1990 births
Living people
Place of birth missing (living people)
French female long-distance runners
European Athletics Championships medalists
Sportspeople from Allier
French female cross country runners